Myromexocentrus tibialis is a species of beetle in the family Cerambycidae, and the only species in the genus Myromexocentrus. It was described by Breuning in 1957.

References

Acanthocinini
Beetles described in 1957
Monotypic beetle genera